First Ebenezer Baptist Church is a historic Baptist church at 420 Graymont Avenue North in Smithfield in Birmingham, Alabama.  It was built in 1963 and the congregation was active in the 1960s Civil Rights Movement. The church was added to the National Register of Historic Places in 2005. This church serves Jefferson County.

References

Baptist churches in Alabama
Churches on the National Register of Historic Places in Alabama
National Register of Historic Places in Birmingham, Alabama
Gothic Revival church buildings in Alabama
Churches completed in 1942
Baptist churches in Birmingham, Alabama